Memorial Parkway, also known as the Parkway, is a major thoroughfare in Huntsville, Alabama that carries over 100,000 vehicles on average a day. It, in whole or in part, follows U.S. Route 231, U.S. Route 431, U.S. Route 72, and State Route 53 through the Huntsville city limits.  It is a limited access road through most of Huntsville city proper, providing exits to the frontage road which allows access to road intersections, as well as businesses and residences along the route.  Both the limited access and frontage roads are referred to as Memorial Parkway.  Originally constructed to bypass downtown Huntsville and officially opened on December 1, 1955, the highway is the major commercial thoroughfare through Huntsville, a status it has held since the mid-1960s.

General plan and structure

The limited access portions of the Parkway contain eight to ten lanes of traffic; in each direction there are two to three lanes of limited-access traffic, paralleled by a two-lane, one-way frontage road. At major intersections, the limited-access lanes overpass the intersecting road with a "camel back" type overpass, while the frontage roads have a signal-controlled intersection with the intersecting road. At each overpass, there is a Texas U-turn configuration  a pair of turn lanes that permit traffic on the frontage roads to make U-turns between the northbound and southbound frontage roads without having to go through the signalized intersection. Generally, in between overpasses, there exists a pair of entrance and exit ramps that allow traffic to transition between the limited-access lanes and the parallel frontage road. Other than at intersections with overpasses, traffic on the frontage road always has the right of way vs. intersecting streets and driveways and there are no other traffic signals. The frontage roads do not exist between the University Drive and Clinton Avenue overpasses; here through traffic must merge into the limited-access lanes.

There are two intersections where the Parkway crosses under the intersecting road, at Martin Road and Interstate 565. At the I-565 interchange, it is possible for Parkway traffic to make a U-turn by executing a sequence of ramp lane changes, although no signage indicates this.

Most of the non-limited access portions within the Huntsville city limits consist of six through lanes, three in each direction, separated by a median. There are no frontage roads on these portions. Most of the portion north of the Mastin Lake Road intersection consists of four lanes, two in each direction.

Route description

From the south, US 231 / Alabama 53 enters Madison County and the city limits of Huntsville over the Tennessee River via the Clement C. Clay Bridge, which is also known as Whitesburg Bridge. From there, the four lane US 231 takes the name of Memorial Parkway and travels north passing Hobbs Island Road where it widens to six lanes.

Memorial Parkway passes to the east of a Sanmina-SCI Corporation production plant, crossing over Green Cove Road. From there, it continues north, passing beside various businesses and farm lands. The Parkway intersects Hobbs Road just south of the first major shopping center of many, the Southeast Plaza Shopping Center. Continuing due north, the Parkway passes Mountain Gap Road and Meadowbrook Drive.

Just north of Meadowbrook Drive, the first of many overpasses start. Vehicles are directed to exit here to access both Whitesburg Drive and Weatherly Road. Just north of Weatherly Road, the Parkway's controlled access highway merges back to a six-lane highway with traffic signals at Lily Flagg Road and Byrd Spring Road. (Previously existing signals at Charlotte Drive and Boulevard South were removed in July 2016.) Then a series of overpasses start just north of Martin Road; the first is Golf Road, followed by Airport Road, passing by John Hunt Park.

Following Airport Road, there is a "useless" overpass, as it is referred to by locals since it crosses over no other roadway. This overpass was originally constructed to provide a convenient U-turn as well as allow quicker access to businesses alongside the Parkway. The Parkway continues north with overpasses at Drake and Bob Wallace Avenues, where it passes by Parkway Place Mall.

At Governors Drive, Alabama 53 splits off and travels west and US 231 begins its overlap with US 431. The Parkway continues north with an overpass at Clinton Ave / Holmes Avenue with a full interchange with Interstate 565; this interchange is sometimes referred to as Malfunction Junction. The Parkway has an overpass at US 72 West/University Drive where an additional overlap with US 72 begins. An overpass at Oakwood Ave leads to a recently constructed overpass over Max Luther Drive and Sparkman Drive, where the overlap with US 72 ends as it splits off to the east. The Parkway continues north with at-grade intersection at Mastin Lake Road, which is planned to have an overpass built by 2021. Memorial Parkway continues north passing by Alabama A&M University with at-grade intersections at Winchester Road, Meridian Street, and Bob Wade Lane, where the Parkway officially ends and the route continues as US 231/431.

History 
US 231 originally ran down through the center of Huntsville following Meridian Street and Whitesburg Drive through Downtown. Memorial Parkway was built as a four-lane highway in the 1950s to bypass downtown. At the time, the only overpass crossed over Holmes Avenue, with ramps providing access from and to the Parkway.  In the early 1960s, the overpass was extended to make it also span Clinton Avenue.  There were traffic signals at every other major intersection, plus a number of secondary intersections, many of which were eliminated over the years as part of the limited-access construction.  With the establishment of the U.S. Army Missile Command at Redstone Arsenal, and the NASA Marshall Space Flight Center in the 1960s, Huntsville underwent massive population growth, and, as a result, traffic increased. State and City leaders started planning to make the Parkway a limited access highway and the second overpass, the "useless" overpass, opened in 1969.

In 1973, the Drake Avenue overpass officially opened, followed by an overpass at Bob Wallace Avenue in 1976. An overpass at Governors Drive opened in 1978. In 1986, the University Drive overpass opened, and in the 1990s, overpasses at Airport Road, Golf Road, and Oakwood Avenue opened making a controlled access highway throughout much of the city.

In 1992, the interchange with I-565 opened.  The interchange includes a mix of cloverleaf and fly-over ramps to provide full merge-in and merge-out access to both routes.  As part of this construction, the original Clinton and Holmes overpasses were torn down and replaced with wider ones incorporating the necessary merge lanes. 

In December 2009, overpasses at Whitesburg Drive and Weatherly Road in South Huntsville opened to the public; and an overpass over Sparkman Drive, Max Luther Drive, and US 72 East opened on April 10, 2012. Prior to 2018, a non-controlled portion of the Parkway remained from the Whitesburg Drive to Martin Road exits, but the construction of new limited-access lanes were completed in 2018, with the previous route becoming frontage roads. As of 2018, the Parkway is fully limited-access from the aforementioned Sparkman Drive exit in the north to just north of Meadowbrook Drive in the south.

Expansion 
Memorial Parkway's limited access portion is being expanded to include interchanges and frontage roads at various cross streets along the Parkway. Overpasses are currently planned for the Parkway's intersections with Winchester Road and Mastin Lake Road on the north side, and Hobbs Road, Green Cove Road, and Hobbs Island Road on the south side. Estimated completion dates for significant current Parkway projects are statuses in a quarterly Construction Bulletin from the Alabama Department of Transportation (ALDOT)'s Bureau of Transportation Planning.

The City of Huntsville is planning construction of a multi-modal bridge to be used by for pedestrians and bicyclist to cross over Memorial Parkway between the interchanges of Holmes Avenue and Governors Drive. This bridge will be a part of the larger Singing River Trail of North Alabama.

North side 
 Walker Lane
 Patterson Lane
 Meridianville Bottom Road
 Winchester Road
 Mastin Lake Road

South side 
 Mountain Gap Road/Hobbs Road
 Green Cove Road
 Hobbs Island Road

In popular culture
 Professional baseball player Jose Canseco earned the nickname "Parkway Jose" while playing with the Huntsville Stars for his ability to hit home runs over the outfield fence at Joe Davis Stadium.

Intersections

Exit list

References

See also
Madison County, Alabama
Huntsville-Decatur Combined Statistical Area
Tennessee Valley

Limited-access roads in the United States
Streets in Alabama
Transportation in Huntsville, Alabama
1955 establishments in Alabama